Tredegar (pronounced) is a town and community situated on the banks of the Sirhowy River in the county borough of Blaenau Gwent, in the southeast of Wales. Within the historic boundaries of Monmouthshire, it became an early centre of the Industrial Revolution in Wales. The relevant wards (Tredegar Central and West, Sirhowy and Georgetown) collectively listed the town's population as 15,103 in the UK 2011 census.

Origins of the name 
The name is a transferred name taken from Tredegar in Coedcernyw by Newport. To avoid confusion, the original Tredegar is nowadays known in English as Tredegar House or Tredegar Park. The name Tredegar is first attested as Tredegyr, which is a compund of tre(f) 'homestead' and the personal name Tegyr. Unfounded attempts to explain the name based on folk etymology include Tre(f)-deg-erw ('the ten-acre-homestead').

In 1800, Samuel Homfray married Jane Morgan, daughter of Sir Charles Gould Morgan, 1st Baronet of Tredegar House, and thus obtained a favourable lease of mineral land in the Sirhowy Valley where he established the Tredegar Ironworks. The company's buildings appeared on the 1832 Ordnance Survey map as Tredegar Iron Works. The name of the town is taken from that of the ironworks. 

In the local Welsh dialect known as Gwenhwyseg, the name was often pronounced as Tredecar (with provection of /g/ to /k/). There was also a shortened form Decar.

History

Pre-industrialisation 
Tredegar grew as a developed town thanks to the natural resources it had within the Sirhowy Valley, namely:

 Iron ore
 Coal with which to produce coke
Power, from the fast-flowing Sirhowy River
Wood, which could be cut for buildings and pit props, and burnt for fuel

Hence by the start of the 1700s, the upper Sirhowy Valley was a natural well-wooded valley, consisting of a few farms and the occasional small iron works where iron ore and coal naturally had occurred together.

Industrialisation
The first recorded iron works in the Sirhowy Valley was Pont Gwaith yr Hearn, developed by two Bretons and worked by men from Penydarren, Merthyr Tydfil. The Sirhowy Iron Works was erected in 1750 by Mr Kettle of Shropshire. In 1778 Kettle sold this ironworks to Thomas Atkinson and William Barrow, who came to the area from London. They developed it as the first coal fired furnace, so men were employed to dig coal at Bryn Bach and Nantybwch, the first small scale coal mining operation in the area. The furnace and hence the business failed in 1794.

Tredegar Ironworks

In 1797, Samuel Homfray, with partners Richard Fothergill and the Matthew Monkhouse built a new furnace, leasing the land from the Tredegar Estate in Newport. This created the new Sirhowy Ironworks, that were in 1800 to become the Tredegar Iron Company, named in honour of the Tredegar Estate at Tredegar House and Tredegar Park in Newport in the south of the county.

In 1891, the company ceased production of iron, but continued to develop coal mines and produce coal. The former Tredegar Ironworks were effectively abandoned, with Whiteheads taking over the southern section of the site from 1907. In 1931, they also closed down their operations, moving everything to their Newport works. TICC continued to develop coal mines and work pits, until it was nationalised in 1946, becoming part of the National Coal Board.

The Tredegar Iron Works in Richmond, Virginia, United States was named in honour of the town.

Tredegar Circle 

Samuel Homfray, an iron master who managed to obtain a large parcel of land in and around Tredegar, is to be thanked for Tredegar Circle and the wide streets running out from it. He showed a great concern about the state of the current streets and how narrow they were, deciding that his new town would have wide streets running out from a central place. Tredegar Circle was first known as 'The Square', but as buildings and shops developed around it people within Tredegar began to refer to it as 'The Circle'.

The town clock which stands in the middle of Tredegar Circle was once where the town stocks resided, with there being records of people being put into the stocks to be punished for petty misdemeanours. People being punished within the stocks would have their legs trapped in the stocks, being kept outside for hours in all weather conditions.

Prostitution was rife within Tredegar Circle, almost having a reputation of being a 'red light district' in the earlier days.

Tredegar Circle was also seen as being an important 'shopping centre', many local tradespeople would go there to set up stalls and sell their wares to the people within Tredegar, before the town clock was erected. Horses and carts loaded with goods would clatter around Tredegar Circle, with almost every type of produce being available to buy within Tredegar Circle. Tredegar Town Hall, a prominent building in The Circle, was rebuilt in 1892.

Tredegar Circle is also known for the pubs that occupy it, although there have been many that have closed down over the years such as the Greyhound Inn and the Freemasons, both once very popular with local workers. There have been many reported arrests within Tredegar Circle, in both present and earlier days, due to drunken and disorderly behaviour.

Welsh language
According to the 2011 Census, 5.4% of Tredegar Central and West's 6,063 (328 residents) resident-population can speak, read, and write Welsh. This is below the county's figure of 5.5% of 67,348 (3,705 residents) who can speak, read, and write Welsh.

Riots
The town is known for its three major riots. In 1868 there were the election riots, which took place after the locals' favourite candidate, Colonel Clifford, was not elected.

Secondly in 1882 there was a major anti-Irish riot in Tredegar. There had been a large Irish community in Tredegar since the 1850s, and for a while there had been tensions. Reports from the time vary, however where they all concur includes the fact the riot began with stone throwing and quickly escalated with Irishmen's homes being destroyed and furniture burned in the streets. The Irish were run out of Tredegar and some were beaten. Troops from Newport and Cardiff had to be called in to quell the violence

Thirdly, there were the anti-Jewish riots of 1911, which some called a pogrom, when Jewish shops were ransacked and the army had to be brought in. Though Jewish businesses and property were attacked, nobody was killed in this riot.

Foundation
Samuel Homfray and his partners needed accommodation for their workers, and so needed to develop a suitable town. The land on the eastside of the Sirhowy river was owned by Lt.Col. Sir Charles Gould Morgan who granted a lease in 1799 to build Tredegar Ironworks Company. In 1800, Homfray married Sir Charles daughter Jane, and hence improved his lease terms. The west bank of the river was owned by Lord Tredegar, and hence in the short term remained undeveloped.

Homfray was a hard task master. He sold franchises to business people who wanted to operate within his town, from which he would take a percentage. He paid his workers in his own private coinage, so that they could not easily spend their wages outside the town. However, the opportunity to work created a boom town, which with a parish population of 1,132 in 1801 had boomed to 34,685 by 1881, in part boosted by the laying of the  stretch of horse drawn track to Newport in 1805.

But all of this development came at a price. Adrian Vaughn, in his 1985 book "Grub, Water & Relief," mentions that in 1832 John Gooch took a managerial post in the Tredegar iron works:

There were several cholera epidemics in the town in the 19th century, and a dedicated cholera burial ground was established at Cefn Golau.

Governance

Links with the Labour Party
Tredegar has strong links with prominent Labour MPs and the history of the Labour Party and the Labour Movement in Britain as a whole. It was the birthplace of Aneurin Bevan, who was responsible for the introduction of the British National Health Service (NHS), and who in the 1920s was involved in the management of Tredegar General Hospital. Neil Kinnock, leader of the Labour Party from 1983 to 1992, was born in Tredegar in 1942 and lived there for most of his early life, attending the town's Georgetown Infants and Junior Schools between 1947 and 1953. His predecessor as leader, Michael Foot, was Labour MP for the local constituency — Ebbw Vale — during his time as party leader. As part of the once safe Labour constituency of Blaenau Gwent, Tredegar was for a period represented by the independent left-wing politician Dai Davies until the general election of 2010, when it reverted to Labour.

Architecture

Bedwellty House
Bedwellty House is a Grade II listed house and gardens. Originally a "low thatched-roof cottage", the old house was renovated in 1809. The present Bedwellty House was built in 1818 as a home for Samuel Homfray, whose Iron and Coal Works were the main local employers for much of the 19th century. The surrounding  Victorian garden and park, designed originally as a Dutch garden around which one could walk or ride without being confronted by gate, fence or outside features, contains the Long Shelter, also a Grade II listed structure built for the Chartist Movement.

Town Clock
One of Tredegar's main attributes is the Town Clock, dominating the southern part of the town centre. The clock was made by JB Joyce & Co of Whitchurch, Shropshire and was the idea of Mrs. R. P. Davies, the wife of the Tredegar Ironworks manager, who had decided that she wanted to present a "lofty illuminated clock", and it was she who decided that it would be erected in the Circle.

"The clock tower is seventy-two feet high. The foundation is of masonry, on which is surmounted the cast-iron base which has four arms from each corner to a distance of sixty feet at a depth of five feet and six inches (152 mm) below ground level. The pillar is wholly composed of cast-iron, upon a square pediment which in turn, receives a rectangular plinth, and upon this stands a cylindrical column of smooth surface and symmetrical diameter, ornamented with suitable coping on which rests the clock surrounded with a weather vane. The plinth is inscribed on the four aspects, on the south side - Presented to the town of Tredegar from the proceeds of a bazaar promoted by Mrs. R.P. Davis. Erected in the year 1858. On the west side is effigy of Wellington, with the legend - Wellington, England's Hero. On the North, the Royal Arms of England; and on the east, the name and description of the founder with his crest, - Charles Jordan, Iron Founder, Newport, Mon. The clock is provided with four transparent faces or dials, each five feet three inches diameter, and these were illuminated originally by gas, but this was later changed to electricity. The minute hands are each two feet two inches long, and the hour hand one foot seven inches long. The clocks mechanism is a fifteen inch (381 mm)  mainwheel strike, with a single four-legged Gravity Escapement driving the four dials. It has a 1¼ second pendulum and the bob weighs two hundredweight".

Climate

Culture and leisure
The Tredegar Town Band, which takes part in national competitions, was founded in 1849.

Tredegar Orpheus Male voice choir, which takes its name from Orpheus, the Greek god of music, was founded in 1909.

Tredegar is home to rugby union teams  Tredegar Rugby Football Club who play in the Swalec League Division Two East and Tredegar Ironsides Rugby Football Club. The club was formed in 1946. There is also the nearby Tredegar and Rhymney Golf Club.

Tredegar is home to Bryn Bach Park, a country park.

Home of the Blaenau Gwent film Academy which gives young people (7-18) opportunity to learn how to produce films and build up confidence, which has gone to produce both multi award-winning films Life of a Plastic Cup and Stationary Bike based on the short story by Stephen King.

Local schools
 Two dame schools prior to 1828
 The Town School opened in 1837
 Earl Street mixed Junior & Infants Schools in 1876
 Georgetown schools in 1877. First Headmistress in 1878
 Georgetown Senior Boys School in 1904
 Sirhowy School
 Tredegar Grammar School
 Tredegar Secondary Modern
 Thomas Richards Centre
 Tredegar Comprehensive school
 Deighton primary school
 Glanhowy primary school
 Georgetown primary school (rebuilt 2004)
 St. Joseph's R.C school
 Brynbach primary school

Transport
The need for transport development came from Tredegar's industrialisation. By 1805, a joint venture between the Tredegar Iron Company and the Monmouthshire Canal resulted in the early development of what became the Merthyr, Tredegar and Abergavenny Railway, connecting Tredegar to Newport Docks through  of tramway. Originally powered by horses, in 1829 Chief Engineer Thomas Ellis was authorised to purchase a steam locomotive from the Stephenson Company. Built at Tredegar Works and made its maiden trip on 17 December 1829. In 1865 the railway was extended north to Nantybwch to meet the LNWR. The railway declined with the industrial works, and Tredegar railway station closed with the Beeching Axe in 1963. The closest railway stations now are in Ebbw Vale, Rhymney and Abergavenny.

The proposed South Wales Metro includes a station in Tredegar, using the line closed by the Beeching Axe.

For much of the 20th Century Tredegar was served by two bus companies: Red & White Services Ltd (based Chepstow) and Hill's of Tredegar (local family-owned business). Red&White had a large depot in the town and built a brand new Bus Station (in front of the depot building) which was opened 30 January 1959 by then local MP Aneurin Bevan.

Carreg Bica Isaf
In October 2013, a local farmer was jailed for ten months after he permitted 4,700 loads of waste to be illegally dumped on his land, earning £283,000. A spokesmen for Natural Resources Wales hoped the case would show that people could not profit from illegal dumping.

Filming location
Tredegar has been used for numerous TV and film locations, including The District Nurse starring Nerys Hughes. In 1982, a televised version of the A.J. Cronin novel, The Citadel, was filmed in Tredegar, starring Ben Cross. The series was based partly on Cronin's experiences as a doctor in the town, where he had worked for the Tredegar Medical Aid Society in the early 1920s. This society contributed the model which established the British National Health Service. Aneurin Bevan who launched the Health Service in 1948 said ""All I am doing is extending to the entire population of Britain the benefits we had in Tredegar for a generation or more. We are going to 'Tredegarise' you"

Just north of Tredegar lies the Trefil region. Trefil found new fame in 2005 when it was used as a location for the alien Vogon homeworld in the film of Douglas Adams's book The Hitchhiker's Guide to the Galaxy.

In 2011 the Trefil Region was once again used as a filming location for a major Hollywood production when parts of a sequel to Clash of the Titans was filmed there.

On 13 May 2008 the car crash scene for short film Cow was filmed on the Tredegar bypass. 'Cow' was produced by Gwent Police and Tredegar Comprehensive School to highlight the dangers of texting while driving. The movie was made available online and received widespread attention, featuring on TV news programs, in newspapers and internet forums worldwide.

On 25 January 2010 the independent movie A Bit of Tom Jones? premiered at Leicester Square, London. Filmed in and around Tredegar, using local people and professional actors, the film was funded by local businesses.

The Doctor Who episode The Hungry Earth was filmed in Bedwellty Pits in 2010.

In 2018 the news of Blaenau Gwent film Academy (based in Tredegar's Little Theatre) was set to adapt the Stephen King's short story ‘Stationary Bike’ spread literally around the world, all of which would be filmed in Tredegar and the nearby Trefil region

Notable people

See also :Category:People from Tredegar
 Anterior, five-piece melodic death metal band
 Aneurin Bevan, Labour statesman, founder of the National Health Service and Member of Parliament for Ebbw Vale (1929–60)
 Mark Colbourne, gold and silver medallist at the 2012 Summer Paralympics
Walter Conway, Secretary of the Tredegar Medical Aid Society, the model which established the National Health Service
 George Cording, cricketer who played as a wicket-keeper for Glamorgan County Cricket Club
 Vincent Cronin, historical, cultural, and biographical writer, especially of the Renaissance period
 Alun Davies, Labour Assembly Member for the Mid and West Wales region
 James Davis, United States Secretary of Labor, U.S. Senator from Pennsylvania, founder of Moose International, the Grand Lodge of Moose in Great Britain
 Edward Donelan PhD, barrister-at-law, Dublin and London, parliamentary counsel, Office of Attorney General Dublin, also had a successful career with the OECD and later as an independent consultant during which he became a world expert on Better Regulation, advising 30 countries on how to improve their regulatory management and building capacities in policymaking and legislative drafting.
 Bradley Dredge, professional golfer on the PGA European Tour
 Jonathan Evans, Conservative former Member of Parliament for Cardiff North
 Bert Gray, footballer who played as a goalkeeper for Tranmere Rovers and the Welsh national team
 Mark Jones, dual-code rugby player who played for both Welsh national teams and Great Britain in rugby league
 Patrick Jones, poet, playwright, and filmmaker, known for collaborating with the Manic Street Preachers
 Neil Kinnock, Member of Parliament for Bedwellty and Islwyn (1970–95), Leader of the Labour Party, European Commissioner and  Life Peer as Baron Kinnock of Bedwellty.
 Stephen Kinnock, Labour Member of Parliament for Aberavon (2015 to date), business executive and husband of Danish Prime Minister, Helle Thorning-Schmidt
 Stuart Lane, rugby union player for Cardiff RFC, Wales, and the British and Irish Lions
 John Lewis, footballer for Cardiff City and Newport County
 Douglas McKie FRSE (1896-1967) chemist
 Nicki McNelly, Anglican priest, former Provost of St John's Cathedral, Oban 
 Christopher Meredith, poet, novelist and faculty of University of Glamorgan
 Tracey Moberly, artist, author and radio show host, best known for her politically-focused work
 David Morgan, cricket administrator, former President of the International Cricket Council and chairman of the England and Wales Cricket Board and Glamorgan County Cricket Club
 Glyn Parry, historian and faculty of Victoria University of Wellington
 Garyn Preen, footballer who currently plays for Merthyr Town
 Berwyn Price, gold and silver medallist at the 1974 and 1978 Commonwealth Games
 Ray Reardon, six-time World Championship-winning snooker player
Moses Russell, football player for Plymouth Argyle and the Welsh national team
 Nick Smith Labour Member of Parliament for Blaenau Gwent (2010-)
Jason Strange, rugby union player for many clubs, currently at Ebbw Vale RFC
 Philip Weekes, mining engineer and manager of the National Coal Board's South Wales coalfields
Bryan White, former Mayor of Tredegar and senior member of the Loyal Order of Moose in Great Britain
Arthur Henry Williams, trade union organiser and Member of the House of Commons of Canada for Ontario
Denzil Williams (born 1938), Rugby Union player for Wales and the British and Irish Lions 
 Phil Williams, scientist and Plaid Cymru Assembly Member for the South Wales East region (1999-2003)
Cliff Wilson, World Amateur Championship-winning snooker player
 Nicky Wire, lyricist, bassist and occasional vocalist of the Manic Street Preachers

Twin towns
 Tredegar has been twinned with Orvault in south-east Brittany since 1979.

References

External links

Tredegar town website
Eiddil Gwent's history of Tredegar
B. Gardner's history of Tredegar and other information
Monumental Inscriptions for Tredegar
Aerial photograph of Tredegar in 1999
Tredegar Town Council
Red&White Services Ltd

 
Towns in Blaenau Gwent